The Sheoraphuli–Bishnupur branch line is a railway line connecting  on the Howrah–Bardhaman main line and . The  railway line traverses Hooghly in the Indian state of West Bengal. It is part of the Kolkata Suburban Railway system.

History
The broad gauge Sheoraphuli–Tarakeswar branch line was opened by the Tarkessur Railway Company on 1 January 1885 and was worked by East Indian Railway Company. The Tarkessur company was taken over by the East Indian Railway in 1915.

The work is sanctioned in 2010-11. at a cost of 365.17 Cr. Also Tarakeswar– Furfura Sharif  New Line project work was sanctioned in year 2012-13 at a cost of Rs. 162.37 Cr. Final location survey completed. Alignment plan for  approved. Land plan under finalisation. Formation and Bridge work completed in Railway land. 219 hectares of land will be required. Formation and bridge work completed in Railway land. Work could not be started due to non availability of land. However the work has been kept in abeyance by Railway board..

Electrification
The Sheoraphuli–Tarakeswar branch line was first electrified with 3,000 V DC system in 1957. Subsequently, when the Railways decided to adopt the AC system, the branch line was converted to 25 kV AC system in 1967. EMU coaches were introduced on electrification.

Tarakeswar–Bishnupur extension

The  Tarakeswar–Bishnupur project was sanctioned in 1999–2000, but not much work was done for the next decade. After Mamata Banerjee again became railway minister in 2009, work was speeded up. Eastern Railway gave out details of the project in 2003. The proposed fully electrified line was divided into three parts: Tarakeswar–Arambagh , Arambagh–Kodabari , and Kodabari–Bishnupur .

Train services were opened in the Tarakeswar–Talpur section on 25 April 2010. The Talpur–Arambagh sector was opened on 4 June 2012, without electrification and auto signaling.

At the time of inaugurating the line, the Chief Minister had said that the Arambag railway station was to be named after former West Bengal chief minister Prafulla Chandra Sen and the Mayapur railway station was to be named after Raja Rammohan Ray.

Without the overhead electrification the railways had no option but to run diesel-electric multiple unit (DEMU) trains initially. Mukul Roy, railway minister, inaugurated the electrified line to Tarakeswar on 16 September 2012. EMU services have since been introduced.

The completion of the Bishnupur–Gokulnagar sector was announced in the railway budget for 2009–10.

In June 2016, Tarakeshwar–Goghat section was commissioned for EMU trains with the introduction of three pairs of Howrah–Goghat locals.

References

5 ft 6 in gauge railways in India
Rail transport in West Bengal

Railway lines opened in 1885